Carex chlorosaccus (syn. Carex brassii) is a species of sedge in the family Cyperaceae, native to  the Gulf of Guinea islands, southwestern Cameroon, and central and eastern tropical Africa. It is typically found in upland grasslands and the understories of montane forests.

References

chlorosaccus
Flora of the Gulf of Guinea islands
Flora of Cameroon
Flora of the Democratic Republic of the Congo
Flora of Rwanda
Flora of Burundi
Flora of Sudan
Flora of Ethiopia
Flora of East Tropical Africa
Flora of Zambia
Flora of Malawi
Flora of Mozambique
Plants described in 1900